This is a list of seasons played by Sport Huancayo in Peruvian and South American football, from 2007 to the most recent completed season. Sport Huancayo was founded in February, 2007 as Huancaína Sport Club by the initiative of a beer company led by Raúl Rojas and Édgar Araníbar, which purchased the playing rights of Club Escuela de Fútbol Huancayo, who was at that time playing in the Liga Distrital de El Tambo. In 2008, the club changed its name to Sport Huancayo to better identify themselves with the city of Huancayo.

The club has won the Copa Perú once, has finished the Peruvian Primera División tournament in third place once, and has finished as Copa Bicentenario runner-up once. This list details the club's achievements in all major competitions, and the top scorers for each season (where the information is available). Top scorers in bold were also the top scorers in the Peruvian Primera División that season.

Key

Key to colors and symbols

Key to league record
 Season = The year and article of the season
 League = League name
 Pld = Games played
 W = Games won
 L = Games lost
 D = Games drawn
 GF = Goals for
 GA = Goals against
 GD = Goal difference
 Pts = Points
 Pos = Regular season position
 Play-offs = Play-offs position

Key to national cups record
 — = Competition not held or canceled
 DNE = Did not enter
 DNQ = Did not qualify
 QR = Qualifying round
 PR = Preliminary round
 GS = Group stage
 R1 = First round
 R2 = Second round
 R3 = Third round
 R4 = Fourth round
 R5 = Fifth round
 Ro16 = Round of 16
 QF = Quarter-finals
 SF = Semi-finals
 F = Final
 RU = Runners-up
 W = Winners

Seasons

Notes

References
Specific

General
 

Sport Huancayo
Sport Huancayo